Microcos paniculata  is a flowering shrub native to China and south-east Asia including India. It's also included in Indian Ayurveda. It is sometimes added to Chinese herbal tea, having a mildly sour taste. In traditional Chinese medicine the plant is believed to help the digestive system, and it is also used for other health problems including colds, hepatitis, diarrhea, heat stroke, and dyspepsia. None of these alleged claims have shown to be effective in clinical trials. The herb may have a placebo effect.

Common names
Burmese - Myaya (မြရာ)
Hindi - Shiral (शिरल) 
Marathi - Shirali 
Konkani(Goa)- Asali
Tamil - Visalam 
Malayalam - Kottakka 
Kannada - Biliyabhhrangu 
Bengali - Asar 
Sinhala - Keliya (කෑලිය) /Kohu-kirilla (කොහු-කිරිල්ල)

References

paniculata
Plants described in 1753
Taxa named by Carl Linnaeus